Prince Rama (previously Prince Rama of Ayodhya) was a two-piece "now age" psych-dance band based in Brooklyn, New York, founded by sisters Taraka Larson and Nimai Larson.

Discovered by Animal Collective's Avey Tare in a Texas dive bar in 2010, the band signed to Paw Tracks shortly thereafter, and have since released Shadow Temple and Trust Now, which peaked at #3 and #6 on the Billboard New Age Charts respectively.

In four years, Prince Rama have released six albums and toured in four of the seven continents, recording with members of Animal Collective and Ariel Pink's Haunted Graffiti. Taraka recently published a manifesto on "Now Age" that puts forth Prince Rama’s aesthetic and metaphysical philosophies.

On August 20, 2019, Taraka Larson announced that the band had been disbanded.

Band members
 Taraka Larson: lead vocals, electric guitar, acoustic guitar, synthesizer, keyboard (2008–present)
 Nimai Larson: drums, drum machine, percussion, vocals (2008–present)
 Ryan Sciaino - guitar, synthesizer

Education
Taraka graduated from the School of the Museum of Fine Arts in Boston, MA in 2009 and Nimai studied Visual Art and Art History at St. Edwards University in Austin, Texas.

Discography 
2008 - Threshold Dances (Cosmos Records, UK)
2009 - Zetland (Self-Released)
2010 - Architecture Of Utopia (Animal Image Search)
2010 - Shadow Temple (Paw Tracks)
2011 - Trust Now (Paw Tracks)
2012 - Utopia = No Person (Not Not Fun)
2012 - Top 10 Hits of the End of the World (Paw Tracks)
2016 - Xtreme Now (Carpark Records)
2019 - Rage in Peace (Carpark Records)

References

External links 
Band Webpage 
Band Manifesto

Musical groups from Brooklyn
Psychedelic rock music groups from New York (state)